Yolanda Saldívar (born September 19, 1960) is an American former nurse who was convicted of the murder of singer Selena in 1995. Saldívar had been the president of Selena's fan club and the manager of her boutiques, but she lost both positions a short time before the murder, when the singer's family discovered that she had been embezzling money from both organizations. 

Three days after the jury found her guilty of murder, they sentenced Saldívar to life imprisonment with the possibility of parole after 30 years, meaning she will become eligible for parole on March 30, 2025.

Biography
Saldívar was born on September 19, 1960, in San Antonio, Texas. She is one of seven children born to Frank and Juanita Saldívar.

Selena fan club
Saldívar, a former nurse, was originally a fan of country music. After attending one of Selena's concerts, she began repeatedly calling Selena's father, Abraham Quintanilla, about starting a fan club in San Antonio. Quintanilla eventually gave in to Saldívar's requests and she immediately became the club's president.

Saldívar was eventually promoted as manager of Selena's clothing boutiques, Selena Etc. By 1993, the fan club had reached 1,500 members in less than four years, and eventually grew to over 5,000. It became one of the largest fan clubs in the San Antonio area.

Murder of Selena

In early 1995, Selena's family discovered that Saldívar had been embezzling money from both the fan club and boutiques, which led to her firing in the first week of March. On the morning of March 31, Selena agreed to meet Saldívar at a Days Inn motel in Corpus Christi to retrieve financial records Saldívar had been refusing to turn over. Saldívar delayed the handover by claiming she had been raped in Mexico. Selena drove Saldívar to a local hospital, where they were told that the gynecological exam was to be done elsewhere, because the assault had allegedly happened in another country. 

They returned to the motel, where Selena once more demanded the records. Saldívar then took a .38 Taurus Model 85 revolver from her purse and pointed it at the singer. Selena tried to flee, but Saldívar shot her once in the back, severing an artery. Critically wounded, Selena ran towards the lobby for help with Saldívar in pursuit calling her a "bitch". 

Selena collapsed on the floor as the clerk called 911. She later died in a hospital from blood loss at 1:05pm.

Trial and imprisonment

Saldívar's trial for the murder of Selena was followed closely by the Latino community in the United States. The trial was not televised, but cameras were permitted on the courthouse premises. The venue was moved to Houston, Texas, after Saldívar's lawyers successfully argued that she could not receive a fair trial in Selena's hometown.

Before the start of the trial, CNN reported that prosecutors were expected to introduce a controversial police confession signed by Saldívar in which she said she shot Selena "during an argument over accusations from the singer's father that Saldívar stole money from Selena's accounts". The defense was expected to introduce testimony from Texas Ranger Robert Garza that "he overheard Saldívar claim the shooting was accidental, and that she objected when police failed to include it in her statement".

The defense attorney argued the shooting was accidental, but the prosecution pointed out that Saldívar, a trained nurse, did not call 911 nor try to help Selena after she was shot.

Jurors deliberated for less than three hours on October23, 1995, before finding Saldívar guilty of murder. Three days later, on October26, she was sentenced to life in prison with the possibility of parole in thirty years; this was the maximum prison term allowed in Texas at the time. On November 22, 1995, she arrived at the Gatesville Unit (now the Christina Melton Crain Unit) in Gatesville, Texas, to be processed.

Saldívar is serving a life sentence at the Mountain View Unit in Gatesville, operated by the Texas Department of Criminal Justice. She will become eligible for parole on March30, 2025.

After the conviction
The revolver used to kill Selena disappeared after the trial. It was later found in a box of office supplies at the home of court reporter Sandra Oballe, who has said she did not realize she had the weapon. Despite objections from some historical groups, it was dismantled and the pieces were thrown into Corpus Christi Bay in 2002.

Saldívar has asked the Texas Court of Criminal Appeals to accept a petition that challenges her conviction. She claims the petition was filed in 2000 with the 214th District Court, but was never sent to the higher court. Her request was received on March31, 2008, the 13th anniversary of Selena's death.

In popular culture 
Saldívar was portrayed by Lupe Ontiveros in the movie Selena, by Damayanti Quintanar in Selena's Secret, a series based on the book of the same name, and by Natasha Perez in the Netflix original series, Selena: The Series. In 2017, Saldivar was portrayed by E.A. Costillo in the television documentary, Murder Made Me Famous.

See also 
 Mark David Chapman, who murdered John Lennon in 1980
 John Hinckley Jr., who attempted to assassinate Ronald Reagan in 1981
 Robert John Bardo, who murdered Rebecca Schaeffer in 1989
 Ricardo López, who attempted to murder Björk in 1996
 Andrew Cunanan, who murdered Gianni Versace in 1997
 Nathan Gale, who murdered Dimebag Darrell in 2004

References

1960 births
20th-century American criminals
American people of Mexican descent
American female murderers
American women nurses
American people convicted of murder
Criminals from Texas
Texas A&M International University alumni
American prisoners sentenced to life imprisonment
Prisoners sentenced to life imprisonment by Texas
People convicted of murder by Texas
People from San Antonio
Selena
Living people